The 1994 Quebec general election was held on September 12, 1994, to elect members of the National Assembly of Quebec. The Parti Québécois, led by Jacques Parizeau, defeated the incumbent Quebec Liberal Party, led by Premier Daniel Johnson Jr.

Johnson had succeeded Robert Bourassa as Liberal leader and Premier. Both his father, Daniel Sr., and brother, Pierre-Marc, had previously served as premiers of Quebec as leaders of different parties.

The election set the stage for the 1995 Quebec referendum on independence for Quebec from Canada. The referendum would see the PQ government's proposals for sovereignty very narrowly defeated.

Mario Dumont, a former president of the Liberal party's youth wing, and then leader of the newly formed Action démocratique du Québec, won his own seat, but no other members of his party were elected.

In Saint-Jean, there was a tie between incumbent Liberal candidate Michel Charbonneau and PQ candidate Roger Paquin. A new election was held on October 24 and was won by Paquin by a margin of 532 votes.

Results
The overall results were:

See also
 List of Quebec premiers
 Politics of Quebec
 Timeline of Quebec history
 35th National Assembly of Quebec

References

External links
 CBC TV video clip
 Results by party (total votes and seats won)
 Results for all ridings

Further reading
 

Quebec general election
Elections in Quebec
General election
Quebec general election